Grêmio Atlético Sampaio, commonly known as GAS, is a Brazilian football club based in Caracaraí, Roraima state. They competed in the Série C once.

GAS is currently ranked third among Roraima teams in CBF's national club ranking at 157th place overall. They are the best placed team in the state from outside capital Boa Vista.

History
The club was founded on June 11, 1965 in Boa Vista, Roraima. They competed in the Série C in 1996, when they were eliminated in the First Stage of the competition.

In 2018 they started a partnership, therefore they moved to Caracaraí.

Stadium
Originally, Grêmio Atlético Sampaio played their home games at Estádio Flamarion Vasconcelos (Boa Vista), nicknamed Canarinho. The stadium has a maximum capacity of 6,000 people.

Starting from 2018, GAS play their home matches at Estadio Vital Rodrigues in Caracaraí.

References

Football clubs in Roraima
Association football clubs established in 1965
1965 establishments in Brazil